Pittsford is the central village and a census-designated place (CDP) in the town of Pittsford, Rutland County, Vermont, United States. As of the 2020 census, it had a population of 805, out of 2,862 in the entire town.

The CDP is in northern Rutland County, slightly east of the center of the town of Pittsford. It sits on high ground overlooking Otter Creek to the west and Furnace Brook, its tributary, to the southeast.

U.S. Route 7 passes through the village, leading north  to Brandon and south  to Rutland. Vermont Route 3 leaves Route 7 at the southern edge of the community and leads south  to Proctor.

References 

Populated places in Rutland County, Vermont
Census-designated places in Rutland County, Vermont
Census-designated places in Vermont